The 2010–11 season of the Women's 2nd Fußball-Bundesliga was the seventh season of Germany's second-tier women's football league. It began on 15 August 2010 and ended regular season ended on 1 May 2011. For the first time the 2nd Bundesliga was won by a reserve team, when Hamburg II won the northern division. With Hamburg playing in the Bundesliga the reserve was not eligible for promotion. Lokomotive Leipzig as runners-up were thus promoted to the Bundesliga. Eventually Hamburg II announced that they would withdraw from the league in the following season due to financial concerns. Cloppenburg and Löchgau, the tenth-place finishers from both divisions, were thus spared a relegation playoff against each other and instead stay in the league. The southern division was won by Freiburg.

League tables
Note: Reserve teams from Fußball-Bundesliga sides were not eligible for promotion.

North

South

Relegation play-off
BV Cloppenburg and FV Löchgau were supposed to play each other on a home and away basis as 10th-place finishers to determine a fifth relegation. After Hamburg II announced on 4 May 2011 not to participate in next season's 2nd Bundesliga due to monetary reasons, those matches were canceled with both teams saved from relegation.

References

2010-11
Ger
2
Women2